Folstad or Følstad is a surname. Notable people with the surname include:

Astrid Folstad (1932–2009), Nowergian actress
Gunhild Følstad (born 1981), Norwegian footballer
Rick Folstad (born 1951), American boxer